Howard "Pappy" Mason (born September 8, 1959) is an American drug trafficker and organized crime figure. Mason and his partner, Lorenzo "Fat Cat" Nichols, ran a drug smuggling gang called the Bebos, in the Jamaica, Queens neighborhood of New York City. The gang sold drugs and netted as much as $200,000 per month in profit.

Murder of Edward Byrne
From behind bars on gun charges, Mason ordered the 1988 murder of a police officer, Edward Byrne, which led to increased law enforcement attention and Mason's eventual arrest and conviction on various charges. A month after the killing, Mason was sentenced to seven years in prison on gun charges.

The federal government continued to investigate Mason for the Byrne killing. On December 11, 1989, Mason was convicted on federal charges including the murder of Officer Byrne. After four years of legal wrangling, including questions of Mason's mental competency, he was given a life sentence in 1994. Mason began serving his life sentence at ADX Florence supermax facility, in Florence, Colorado and was subsequently transferred around 2015 to USP Allenwood.

In 1990, Mason's mother, Claudia Mason, was sentenced to 10 years in prison for drug trafficking after she continued to run his crack business while he was in prison. She was released on 27 March, 1998. Her BOP Register Number was 24652-053.

Popular culture

Music
Rapper Cormega references Mason in the song Therapy, "I rep NYC with no kingly aspiration, my feet stand on pavement once felt by Pappy Mason".

Nas mentions Mason in several albums, including:
His debut album Illmatic (1994). In the single "The World Is Yours", Nas rhymes: "The mind activation, react like I'm facing time like 'Pappy' Mason with pens I'm embracing."
In his album God's Son (2002). In the single "Get Down", Nas rhymes: "New York streets where killers'll walk like Pistol Pete And 'Pappy' Mason, gave the young boys admiration." 
In his album Street's Disciple (2004), in the single, "Just A Moment".

50 Cent brings up Mason in multiple songs:
 Mason, as well as Kenneth "Supreme" McGriff, are referenced directly in 50 Cent's "Ghetto Qu'ran (Forgive Me)", which leaked in 2000 from his unreleased Columbia Records debut album Power of the Dollar, in the lyric: "I used to idolize (fat) cat Lorenzo "Fat Cat" Nichols, Hurt me in my heart to hear that nigga snitched on Pap (Howard "Pappy" Mason), how he go out like that?"
 "I Don't Need Em", off the album The Massacre (2005).

Mason is referenced in Jay-Z & R. Kelly's Best of Both Worlds Album, on track 1: " The combination of Pappy Mason and Larry Davis, Martin and Malcolm this is bigger than the Album."

He is mentioned in a single "Bomba" (translated in English as "Bomb") by the Serbian rapper Struka, who rhymes: "If hip-hop was horror movie I would be Jason, legend in hood like in Queens Pappy Mason" (translated to English from the original: "...Da je hip hop horor film ja bih bio Džejson, Legenda u kraju k'o u Kvinsu Pepi Mejson").

He is mentioned by Booba, a French rapper living in Miami, in the song "Call of bitume" featuring Rim-K, another French rapper. "RG (French private espionage agency) are stalking me anywhere I am from Miami to Corbeil-Essonnes, no more surprised, I'm determinated like Pappy Mason".

On October 19, 2012, XV released his anticipated mixtape Squarians Vol. 1.  On the song "A Situation", Mason is also mentioned: "I'm in the lane with a dime that I'm penetrating, and her cat is real fat, yeah, Pappy Mason."

He is referenced by Kendrick Lamar in his 2013 BET Cypher verse.

Television
In the Luke Cage episode "Manifest", Shades mentions that Mason and former Mayor David Dinkins were acquaintances of "Momma" Mabel Stokes'.

References

1959 births
Living people
Gang members
People from Queens, New York
African-American gangsters
American gangsters
American drug traffickers
American crime bosses
American people convicted of murdering police officers
Place of birth missing (living people)
American prisoners sentenced to life imprisonment
Gangsters sentenced to life imprisonment
People convicted of murder by the United States federal government
Prisoners sentenced to life imprisonment by the United States federal government
Inmates of ADX Florence
Criminals from Queens, New York
Gangsters from New York City
21st-century African-American people
20th-century African-American people